Albert Jansz Vinckenbrink (1604 in Spaarndam – 1665 in Amsterdam), was a Dutch Golden Age sculptor in Amsterdam.

Biography

According to the RKD he was a sculptor who learned from his father and became the father of the sculptors Jan, Hendrik, and Abraham Vinckenbrinck.  He married Geertruyt Collaert. He made the pulpit for the Nieuwe kerk, and a sketch of this is in the portrait made of him by the Holsteyn brothers. That print claims he was a "sculptor of the city of Amsterdam".
According to the Amsterdam Museum he made the statues of David and Goliath now in their café.

References

1604 births
1665 deaths
Dutch Golden Age sculptors
Dutch male sculptors
People from Haarlemmerliede en Spaarnwoude
Artists from Amsterdam